Jane W. Robinson (June 22, 1926 - August 21, 2001) was a member of the Florida House of Representatives representing the 73rd district from 1970 to 1972 and the 46th district from 1972 to 1976.

References 

1926 births
2001 deaths
Women state legislators in Florida
People from Cocoa, Florida
Politicians from Oklahoma City
Republican Party members of the Florida House of Representatives
University of Oklahoma alumni